Windler is a German surname. Notable people with the surname include:

Dylan Windler (born 1996), American basketball player
Milton Windler (born 1932), NASA Flight Director

See also
 Swindler (surname)
 Wendler (disambiguation)
 Zindler

German-language surnames
Surnames from nicknames